Frederick Joseph Blakeney  (2 July 191316 June 1990) was an Australian public servant and diplomat.

Blakeney joined the Commonwealth Public Service in the Department of External Affairs in 1946. His first post as head of mission at an overseas posting was as Minister to Cambodia, Laos and Vietnam.

In March 1974, Blakeney was appointed Australian Ambassador to the Netherlands. In 1977 he completed his post in The Hague and was appointed the Australian Ambassador to the European Office of the United Nations in Geneva.

Blakeney retired from the public service in 1978.

References

1913 births
1990 deaths
Permanent Representatives of Australia to the United Nations Office in Geneva
Ambassadors of Australia to Cambodia
Ambassadors of Australia to Laos
Ambassadors of Australia to Vietnam
Ambassadors of Australia to the Netherlands
Australian Commanders of the Order of the British Empire
University of Sydney alumni